Prudnik  is a town in southern Poland, located in the southern part of Opole Voivodeship near the border with the Czech Republic. It is the administrative seat of Prudnik County and Gmina Prudnik. Its population numbers 21,368 inhabitants (2016). Since 2015, Prudnik is a member of the Cittaslow International.

The town was founded in the 1250s, and was historically part of the Polish-ruled Duchy of Opole, and afterwards was located within the Habsburg monarchy, Poland, Habsburg Monarchy again, Prussia, Germany, and eventually Poland again. It was once an important industrial hub known for its shoe-making traditions and more recently towel making by the ZPB "Frotex" Company, one of the largest towel manufacturers in Europe. The town also possesses numerous architectural monuments and historic buildings such as the Main Town Hall and "Wok's Tower" (Wieża Woka) from the 13th-century.

Geography
Prudnik is located in the historic Silesia (Upper Silesia) region at the confluence of the Prudnik river and its Złoty Potok tributary. The city is situated on the border of Opawskie Mountains and the Prudnik Depression (a part of the Silesian Lowlands). Prudnik and Vrbno pod Pradědem are headquarters of the Euroregion Praděd.

Etymology

The name "Prudnik" was created after Polish word prąd (flow, stream, Czech: proud, Silesian: prōnd) and, like nearby Prężyna, means a river with a fast stream. In the Middle Ages, the city's name was written with a letter u, which was Czech counterpart of ą (1262 Pruthenos, 1331 Prudnik). Since the 17th century, the name Prudnik was used along with Neustadt.

The town's German name was also written in its Latin form Neostadium. Sometimes its Polish and Czech translations were used (Nowe Miasto, Nové Město). The town's older name also had its Latin form (Prudnicium). The town was also called Polnisch Neustadt ("Polish New Town"), but in 1708 it got replaced with Königliche Stadt Neustadt ("Royal Town New Town"). Its Polish counterpart Nowe Miasto Królewskie was used in a Polish document published in 1750 by Frederick the Great.

In the 19th century, the city's name was changed to Neustadt in Oberschlesien ("New Town in Upper Silesia"), while the Slavic name Prudnik was still used by its Polish inhabitants, which was mentioned in Upper Silesia's topographical description from 1865: "Der ursprünglische Stadtname „Prudnik" ist noch jetz bei den polnischen Landbewohnern üblich". In the alphabetic list of cities of Silesia published by Johann Knie in Wrocław in 1830, Polish name Prudnik was used along with German Neustadt ("Prudnik, polnische Benennung der Kreistadt Neustadt").

In Polish publications since the 20th century, the city's name was written as Prądnik. This name was also used formally in 1945. The city's name was changed to Prudnik on 7 May 1946.

In Polish, the city name has masculine grammatical gender.

History

Prehistory 
The first human traces in the present town area, confirmed by archaeological excavations, are dated to the Paleolithic times. Local early Slavs maintained trade contacts with Rome, which is confirmed by Roman coins found here dating back to 700 BC–1250 AD.

Middle Ages

The area of present Prudnik was located at the border of Golensizi and Opolans. Between the years of 1255 and 1259 the Czech knight Wok of Rosenberg founded in the defensive bend of the Prudnik river a castle, and his son Jindřich obtained the city rights in 1279. In 1337 it became a part of the Duchy of Opole, and remained under the rule of local Polish dukes of the Piast dynasty until the dissolution of the duchy in 1532, when it was incorporated into the Austrian-ruled Bohemian (Czech) Crown. It was located on a trade route between Wrocław and Vienna.

The oldest known form of Prudnik's coat of arms comes from a 1399 wax seal. A knight Maćko of Prudnik participated in the Battle of Grunwald fought on 15 July 1410 during the Polish–Lithuanian–Teutonic War. Maćko fought together with the troops of the Crown of the Kingdom of Poland.

On 23 March 1464, Prudnik and villages around it were excommunicated by Pope Pius II for refusing to pay the debt of Duke Konrad IV the Older. Although local historian Antoni Dudek claimed that the excommunication was lifted in 16th century, the Pope never revealed a document that lifted the curse.

Early modern era

In 1562, the Austrian-ruled Duchy of Opole and Racibórz passed a resolution that obligated Jews to sell their houses, pay their debts, and leave the duchy in a year. On the basis of this resolution, in 1564, Jews were ordered to leave Prudnik, but Krzysztof Prószkowski, who leased the land there, let them stay until 1570. The town was captured and plundered by the Swedes in 1632, during the Thirty Years' War. In 1645 along with Opole and Racibórz it returned to Poland under the House of Vasa, and in 1666 it fell to Austria again.

In 1742 the town was incorporated into Prussia. During the Seven Years' War it was the scene of a bloody surprise attack on 15 March 1760 upon the Prussians as they were marching out of the city. The London Magazine of April 1760 reported "General Laudohn, who had set out from his Quarters on 14th with Palfy's Regiment of Cuirassiers, Lowenstein's Dragoons, 500 Hussars of Nadaski, 500 of Kalnocki, 2000 Croats and 14 Companies of Grenadiers, marched all Night with a View to surprise our Troops at Neustadt. The latter were scarce out of the Gates, when they were surrounded by those of the Enemy. General Jacquemin was posted with the Regiment of Lowenstein near Buchelsdorff on the road to Steinau, General Laudohn followed with the Regiment of Palfy and 2000 Croats, supported by 14 Companies of Grenadiers; a thousand of their Hussars were upon our right flank, the advanced Guard of which consisted of 100 Men under Capt. Blumenthal of the Regiment of Manteuffel. Capt Zitzewitz commanded the Rear Guard, consisting of the same number; and the rest of the aforesaid regiment, with a Squadron of Dragoons of Bareith under Capt. Chambaud, followed with the Baggage. General Laudohn summoned out Troops twice, by Sound of Trumpet, to lay down their Arms; which they not complying with, he ordered all his Cavalry to advance: Whereupon General Jacquemin fell upon the advance Guard, while General Laudohn himself attacked the Rear, and the Hussars, in Platoons, flanked the Baggage. The Captains Blumenthal and Zittzwitz formed their small Force in a Kind of Square, from whence they kept a continual fire. The enemy's Cavalry nevertheless advanced six Times on a Gallop, to within ten Paces of our Troops; but perceiving many fall on their Side, among whom were several Officers, they retreated in great Disorder... The Loss of the Austrians however greatly exceeds ours; they buried above 300 Men, in different Places, and sent 500 Wounded to Neustadt. Besides which we have taken 25 Prisoners, amongst whom are several Officers. We had 35 men killed, and four Officers and 65 private Men wounded, in Manteuffel's Regiment, as also one Lieutenant, with three Dragoons in Bareich's... The Officers, taken Prisoners, by our Troops, commend highly the Bravery of the Regiment of Manteuffel upon this Occasion."

In the subsequent years, the area developed into a significant centre of handcraft, in particular cloth production and shoe-making. In the 19th century, the surrounding factories continued the local tradition of handicraft. The indigenous Polish population was subject to Germanisation policies. Due to the lack of Polish schools, local Poles sent their children to schools in so-called Congress Poland in the Russian Partition of Poland. Local Polish activist, publicist and teacher , was investigated by the local Prussian administration and police for writing about this practice in the Gazeta Toruńska, a major Polish newspaper in the Prussian Partition of Poland.

Interbellum and World War II

Prudnik remained part of Germany after Poland regained independence in 1918, however, Polish organizations still operated in the town in the interbellum, including the Union of Poles in Germany and the Polish-Catholic School Society. Polish Prime Minister Ignacy Jan Paderewski proposed to incorporate Prudnik into Poland in his unrealized political concept of the United States of Poland, which was presented to the US President Woodrow Wilson. In a secret Sicherheitsdienst report from 1934, Prudnik was named one of the main centers of the Polish movement in western Upper Silesia. Nazi Germany increasingly persecuted local Polish activists since 1937, and carried out mass arrests in August and September 1939. On 7 September 1938, Prudnik was visited by Adolf Hitler along with Hermann Göring, Heinrich Himmler, Gerd von Rundstedt, Erhard Milch, Hans-Jürgen Stumpff, Josef Wagner and Hellmut Körner.

During World War II the Germans established four forced labour camps and four working units for British and Soviet prisoners of war. On 26 September 1944, a subcamp of the Auschwitz concentration camp was founded in the Schlesische Feinweberei AG textile mill (now ZPB "Frotex"). Around 400 women, mostly from German-occupied Hungary, were imprisoned in the subcamp, and some died. In January 1945, the prisoners of the subcamp were evacuated by the Germans to the Gross-Rosen concentration camp in a death march. During the final months of the war, the town was also a stopping place of death marches of thousands of prisoners of several other subcamps of Auschwitz, and of Allied prisoners-of-war transferred by the Nazis from all over Europe to stalags built in occupied Poland. About 30,000 PoWs were force-marched westward across Poland, Czechoslovakia and Germany in winter conditions, lasting about four months from January to April 1945. The Red Army captured Neustadt on 18 March 1945.

In modern Poland

After the end of the Second World War in 1945, Neustadt was transferred from Germany to Poland according to the Potsdam Conference, and given its original Polish name of Prądnik (changed to Prudnik in 1946). Prudnik became part of the Katowice Voivodeship from 1946 to 1950, after which it became part of the Opole Voivodeship. Unlike other parts of the so-called Recovered Territories, Prudnik and the surrounding region's indigenous population remained and was not forcibly expelled as elsewhere. Over 1 million Silesians who considered themselves Poles or were treated as such by the authorities due to their language and customs were allowed to stay after they were verified as Poles in a special verification process. It involved declaring Polish nationality and an oath of allegiance to the Polish nation. Many Polish settlers and refugees were transferred here from the Kresy in the former Polish eastern territories annexed by the Soviet Union.

In the later years however many of them left to West Germany to flee the communist Eastern Bloc (see Emigration from Poland to Germany after World War II). Today Prudnik, along with the surrounding region, is known as a centre of the German minority in Poland that recruits mainly from the descendants of the positively verified autochthons. In the city itself however only 1% of the inhabitants declared German nationality according to the last national census of 2002.

In September 1980, 1500 workers of ZPB "Frotex" and firefighters from Prudnik's fire brigade went on the biggest anti-communist strike in Opole Voivodeship. The strike lasted 5 days (5–10 September).

Historical population

German minority
Alongside German and Polish, many citizens of Prudnik before 1945 used a strongly German-influenced Silesian language (sometimes called wasserpolnisch or wasserpolak). Because of this, the post-war Polish state administration after the annexation of Silesia in 1945 did not initiate a general expulsion of all former inhabitants of Prudnik, as was done in Lower Silesia, for instance, where the population almost exclusively spoke the German language. Because they were considered "autochthonous" (Polish), the Wasserpolak-speakers instead received the right to remain in their homeland after declaring themselves as Poles. Some German speakers took advantage of this decision, allowing them to remain in Silesia, even when they considered themselves to be of German nationality. The city surroundings currently contain the largest German and Upper Silesian minorities in Poland. However, Prudnik itself is only 1% German.

Sights
Prudnik is a town rich in historic architecture from various periods. Among its sights are:
 medieval Wok's Tower (Wieża Woka), a remnant of the castle
 preserved parts of the medieval town walls with the Lower Gate (Brama Dolna) and the Katowska and Mała towers which are part of the local historical museum (Muzeum Ziemi Prudnickiej)
 Baroque-Classicist Prudnik Town Hall
 Baroque St. Michael's Church
 Baroque Saints Peter and Paul Church
 Park Miejski ("Town Park") with the Diana statue, a monument to local Polish activists fallen in the Silesian Uprisings and murdered in Nazi concentration camps, a monument commemorating the 1000th anniversary of the founding of the Polish State, etc.
 Prudnik Culture Centre (Prudnicki Ośrodek Kultury)
 public Town Bath (Łaźnia Miejska)
 St. Joseph Church
 World War II memorials, including a memorial to Polish children and youth, heroes and victims of the war at the Plac Szarych Szeregów ("Gray Ranks Square"), a monument to Polish soldiers fighting on various war fronts for Poland's freedom at the Plac Wolności ("Freedom Square"), and two mass graves of prisoners of the Nazi German Auschwitz concentration camp, murdered in the town in 1945
 Baroque Marian column and Saint John of Nepomuk statue

Education

Preschools
 Publiczne Przedszkole nr 1 (5 Mickiewicza Street)
 Zespół Szkolno-Przedszkolny nr 2 (12 Szkolna Street)
 Publiczne Przedszkole nr 3 (69 Piastowska Street)
 Publiczne Przedszkole nr 4 (9 Mickiewicza Street)
 Publiczne Przedszkole Specjalne nr 5 (1 Młyńska Street)
 Publiczne Przedszkole nr 6 (9a Podgórna Street)
 Publiczne Przedszkole nr 8 (1 Ogrodowa Street)
 Niepubliczne Przedszkole "Skrzat" (66 Grunwaldzka Street)

Primary schools
 Publiczna Szkoła Podstawowa nr 1 (9 Podgórna Street)
 Zespół Szkolno-Przedszkolny nr 2 (12 Szkolna Street)
 Publiczna Szkoła Podstawowa nr 3 (12 Szkolna Street)
 Publiczna Szkoła Podstawowa nr 4 (2 Dąbrowskiego Street)
 Publiczna Szkoła Podstawowa Specjalna nr 5 (1 Młyńska Street)

Secondary schools
 Publiczne Gimnazjum nr 1 (1 Armii Krajowej Street)
 Publiczne Gimnazjum nr 2 (2 Dąbrowskiego Street)
 Publiczne Gimnazjum Specjalne nr 3 (1 Młyńska Street)

High schools
 I Liceum Ogólnokształcące (2 Gimnazjalna Street)
 II Liceum Ogólnokształcące (55 Kościuszki Street)
 Liceum Ogólnokształcące dla dorosłych (5 Podgórna Street)
 Zespół Szkół Medycznych (Medical School) (26 Piastowska Street)
 Zespół Szkół Rolniczych (76 Kościuszki Street)
 Zespół Szkół Zawodowych (5 Podgórna Street)
 Państwowa Szkoła Muzyczna I st. (36 Traugutta Street)
 Szkoła policealna dla dorosłych (26 Piastowska Street)

Religion

Catholic Church
Prudnik Deanery
 Saint Michael the Archangel parish (Plac Farny 2)
 Saint Michael the Archangel church (Plac Farny 2)
 Saints Peter and Paul church (6 Piastowska Street)
 Saint Joseph church (Prudnik-Las, 5 Józefa Poniatowskiego Street)
 Divine Mercy parish (35 Skowrońskiego Street)
 Divine Mercy church (35 Skowrońskiego Street)

Pentecostal Church
 Zbór Syloe (40A Kolejowa Street)

Jehovah's Witnesses
 zbór Prudnik (Kingdom Hall, 22A Piastowska Street)

Cemeteries 
 Cmentarz Komunalny (19 Kościuszki Street)
 Jewish cemetery (40 Kolejowa Street)

Sport

Sports venues
 Football pitch (Kolejowa 7)
 Football pitch (Włoska 10)
 Sports Hall "Obuwnik"
 Orlik 2012 field
 Summer swimming pool

Sports teams
 KS Pogoń Prudnik (basketball)
 MKS Pogoń Prudnik (football)
 KS Obuwnik Prudnik (archery)
 LKS Zarzewie Prudnik (karate, chess)
 LKJ Olimp Prudnik (equestrianism)
 Stowarzyszenie Sportowe „Tigers" Prudnik (football, parkour, freerunning)
 SPPS Ro-Nat GSM Prudnik (volleyball)

Economy

The biggest corporations in Prudnik were Zakłady Przemysłu Bawełnianego "Frotex", which got closed in 2014 and Prudnickie Zakłady Obuwia "Primus", which got closed in 2007.

Currently, the major industrial plants in Prudnik are:

 Steinpol Central Services (furniture industry)
 Spółdzielnia "Pionier" (auto parts industry)
 Artech Polska (printing cartridges industry)
 Okręgowa Spółdzielnia Mleczarska (food industry)
 Henniges Automotive (auto parts industry)

Notable people

Born in Prudnik
 Nicholas Henel (1582–1656), historian, receiver, biographer and a chronicler
 Matthäus Apelles von Löwenstern (1594–1648), psalmist, musician and statesman
 Shmuel of Karov (c. 1735–1820), Polish Hasidic rebbe
 Karl Dziatzko (1842–1903), scholar
 Karl Heinisch (1847–1923), painter
 Eugen Fraenkel (1853–1925), pathologist and bacteriologist
 Max Pinkus (1857–1934), industrialist and a bibliophile
 Otto von Garnier (1858–1947), German General of the Cavalry during World War I
 Wilhelm Siegmund Frei (1885–1943), dermatologist
 Ludwig Hardt (1886–1947), actor
 Felice Bauer (1887–1960), fiancée of Franz Kafka
 Hellmuth Reymann (1892–1988), officer in the German Army during World War II
 Dietrich von Choltitz (1894–1966), German General, the last commander of Nazi-occupied Paris
 Kurt Wintgens (1894–1916), German World War I pilot
 Józef Wojaczek (1901–1993), Roman Catholic Priest, member of the Mariannhill Missionaries
 Hans Hoffmann (1902–1949), lyrical tenor and musicologist
 Karl Streibel (1903–1986), commander of the Trawniki concentration camp
 Bernd Scholz (1911–1969), composer
 Margarete Müller (born 1931), politician
 Dietrich Unkrodt (1934–2006), classical and jazz tuba player
 Jan Góra (1948–2015), youth activist
 Joanna Helbin (born 1960), archer
 Tadeusz Madziarczyk (born 1961), politician
 Bogusław Pawłowski (born 1962), biologist
 Maria Koc (born 1964), politician
 Aleksandra Konieczna (born 1965), actress
 Jarosław Wasik (born 1971), singer-songwriter
 Peter Peschel (born 1972), football player
 Krzysztof Szafrański (born 1972), racing cyclist
 Grzegorz Kaliciak (born 1973), Colonel of Polish Armed Forces
 Lukasz Gadowski (born 1977), entrepreneur and investor
 Ewa Plonka (born 1982), operatic soprano
 Michał "Z.B.U.K.U" Buczek (born 1992), rapper
 Tomasz Pusz (born 1997), musician

Other residents
 Gebhard Leberecht von Blücher (1742–1819), field marshal
 Joseph Freiherr von Eichendorff (1788–1857), poet
 Samuel Fränkel (1801–1881), industrialist
  (1841–1902), local Polish activist, publisher and teacher
 Paul Ehrlich (1854–1915), Nobel Prize-winning physician and scientist
 Paul Robert Kollibay (1863–1919), lawyer and ornithologist
 Kazimierz Raszewski (1864–1941), lieutenant general of the Polish Army
 Paul Heinrich Theodor Müller (1896–c. 1945), Concentration Camp Operational Leader at Auschwitz concentration camp
 Stefan Wyszyński (1901–1981), archbishop
 Franz Augsberger (1905–1945), SS commander
 Władysław Lemiszko (1911–1988), Ice Hockey player, Olympian, football manager
 Harry Thürk (1927–2005), writer
 Anna Myszyńska (1931–2015), writer
 Gerard Bernacki (1942–2018), bishop
 Jadwiga Szoszler-Wilejto (born 1949), archer
 Stanisław Szozda (1950–2013), Olympic cyclist
 Andrzej Zając (born 1956), Paralympian
 Krzysztof Pieczyński (born 1957), actor
 Janusz Zarenkiewicz (born 1959), boxer
 Jerzy Czerwiński (born 1960), politician
 Józef Stępkowski (born 1970), politician
 Lukas Klemenz (born 1995), association football player

Twin towns – sister cities
See twin towns of Gmina Prudnik.

References

External links

 Municipal website
 Parafia pw. Miłosierdzia Bożego
 Jewish Community in Prudnik on Virtual Shtetl
 Webcams
 Radio
 Opolskie – photogallery

 
Cities in Silesia
Cities and towns in Opole Voivodeship
13th-century establishments in Poland
Populated places established in the 1250s
Holocaust locations in Poland
Province of Upper Silesia